The 2017 San Francisco Deltas season is the club's only season of existence. The club plays in North American Soccer League, the second tier of the American soccer pyramid.

Roster

Staff
  Marc Dos Santos – Head Coach

Winter
Note: Flags indicate national team as has been defined under FIFA eligibility rules. Players may hold more than one non-FIFA nationality.

In:

Out:

Summer

In:

Out:

Friendlies

Competitions

NASL Spring season

Standings

Results summary

Results by round

Matches

NASL Fall season

Standings

Results summary

Results by round

Matches

NASL Playoff

Soccer Bowl

U.S. Open Cup

Squad statistics

Appearances and goals

|-
|colspan="14"|Players away on loan:
|-
|colspan="14"|Players who left San Francisco Deltas during the season:
|}

Goal scorers

Disciplinary record

References

External links
 

San Francisco Deltas seasons
American soccer clubs 2017 season
2017 North American Soccer League season
2017 in sports in California